General elections were held in Palau on 7 November 2000. Thomas Remengesau Jr. was elected President, whilst Sandra Pierantozzi was elected Vice President.

Results

President

Senate

House of Delegates

References

Palau
General
Elections in Palau
Non-partisan elections
Presidential elections in Palau
Election and referendum articles with incomplete results